Phragmorchis is a monotypic genus of flowering plants from the orchid family, Orchidaceae. The sole species is Phragmorchis teretifolia, endemic to the Island of Luzon in the Philippines.

See also 
 List of Orchidaceae genera

References 

 Berg Pana, H. 2005. Handbuch der Orchideen-Namen. Dictionary of Orchid Names. Dizionario dei nomi delle orchidee. Ulmer, Stuttgart

External links 
Phragmorchis teretifolia L.O.Williams 1938 Drawing by © Dillon and Malesian Orchid Genera Photo Website

Monotypic Epidendroideae genera
Vandeae genera
Endemic orchids of the Philippines
Aeridinae